Roland Conde Lamah (born 31 December 1987) is a footballer who plays as a left winger for USL Championship side Memphis 901. Born in the Ivory Coast, Lamah represents Belgium internationally.

Club career

Early years / Osasuna
Born in Abidjan, Ivory Coast, Lamah started playing in Belgium, representing C.S. Visé in the second division and R.S.C. Anderlecht in the Pro League. In the 2007–08 season, he represented Roda JC Kerkrade on loan from the latter.

In the summer of 2008, Lamah moved clubs and countries again, joining France's Le Mans UC 72 on a four-year contract and making his Ligue 1 debut on 30 August by playing one minute in a 4–1 away win against FC Nantes. After suffering relegation in 2010, he competed in Ligue 2 with the team.

On 24 August 2011, after a successful medical, Lamah penned a three-year deal with Spanish side CA Osasuna. he scored four goals all competitions comprised during his one-and-a-half-year spell in Navarre, also being sent off during a 1–5 home loss to Real Madrid in late March 2012.

Swansea City
On 15 January 2013, Swansea City signed Lamah on an initial 18-month loan after which the Welsh could make it a permanent move. He made his debut four days later, coming on as a 63rd-minute substitute for Pablo Hernández in a 3–1 win over Stoke City at the Liberty Stadium. Also from the bench, he featured 12 minutes to help his team win the League Cup after a 5–0 success against Bradford City.

Lamah scored his first Swansea goal on 29 August 2013 in a UEFA Europa League play-off second leg against FC Petrolul Ploiești, finishing from a cross by Alejandro Pozuelo in an eventual 1–2 away loss but 6–3 aggregate win. He netted for the first time in the league on 28 December, in a 1–1 draw at Aston Villa. His second goal came against West Bromwich Albion on 15 March 2014, opening the scoring in the second minute of a 1–2 home defeat after being set up by Wilfried Bony.

Ferencváros
On 9 September 2014, having been released by Osasuna, Lamah signed for Hungarian club Ferencvárosi TC, the move being permitted outside the transfer window as he was a free agent. On 2 April 2016, in spite of a 1–2 away loss against Debreceni VSC, he and his team won the national championship after a 12-year wait.

FC Dallas
On 16 December 2016, Lamah signed with Major League Soccer side FC Dallas. Lamah was released by Dallas the end of their 2018 season.

FC Cincinnati
On 11 December 2018, Lamah was selected by FC Cincinnati in the 2018 MLS Expansion Draft, transferring his MLS rights from Dallas. Cincinnati declined Lamah's option at the end of the 2019 season.

Memphis 901
In March 2021, Lamah joined Memphis 901 FC of the USL Championship.

International career
Lamah chose to represent Belgium internationally, gaining 20 caps at youth level. He made his debut for the full side on 9 September 2009, coming on as a late substitute for Wesley Sonck in a 1–2 loss in Armenia for the 2010 FIFA World Cup qualifiers.

Personal
Lamah holds a U.S. green card which qualifies him as a domestic player for MLS roster purposes.

Honours
Anderlecht
Belgian Pro League: 2006–07

Swansea City
Football League Cup: 2012–13

Ferencváros
Magyar Kupa: 2014–15
Ligakupa: 2014–15

References

External links

1987 births
Living people
Footballers from Abidjan
Naturalised citizens of Belgium
Ivorian footballers
Belgian footballers
Association football wingers
Belgian Pro League players
Challenger Pro League players
C.S. Visé players
R.S.C. Anderlecht players
Eredivisie players
Roda JC Kerkrade players
Ligue 1 players
Ligue 2 players
Le Mans FC players
La Liga players
CA Osasuna players
Premier League players
Swansea City A.F.C. players
Nemzeti Bajnokság I players
Ferencvárosi TC footballers
Major League Soccer players
FC Dallas players
FC Cincinnati players
Memphis 901 FC players
Belgium youth international footballers
Belgium under-21 international footballers
Belgium international footballers
Ivorian expatriate footballers
Belgian expatriate footballers
Expatriate footballers in Belgium
Expatriate footballers in the Netherlands
Expatriate footballers in France
Expatriate footballers in Spain
Expatriate footballers in Wales
Expatriate footballers in Hungary
Expatriate soccer players in the United States
Ivorian emigrants to Belgium
Belgian expatriate sportspeople in the Netherlands
Belgian expatriate sportspeople in France
Belgian expatriate sportspeople in Spain
Belgian expatriate sportspeople in Wales
Belgian expatriate sportspeople in Hungary
Belgian expatriate sportspeople in the United States
Black Belgian sportspeople